This is a list of people who have served as Custos Rotulorum of Herefordshire.

 John Scudamore bef. 1544
 Richard Warnecombe bef. 1544–1547
 John Scudamore (died 1571) 1547–1571 
 Sir James Croft bef. 1573 –1574
 Sir John Scudamore 1574–1616
 Sir James Scudamore 1616–1619
 Sir John Scudamore 1619–1622
 John Scudamore, 1st Viscount Scudamore 1622–1646, 1660–1671
 Edward Harley Mar–July 1660
 Henry Somerset, 1st Duke of Beaufort 1671–1689
 Charles Gerard, 1st Earl of Macclesfield 1689–1694
 Thomas Coningsby, 1st Earl Coningsby 1696–1721
For later custodes rotulorum, see Lord Lieutenant of Herefordshire.

References

External links 
Institute of Historical Research - Custodes Rotulorum 1544-1646
Institute of Historical Research - Custodes Rotulorum 1660-1828

Herefordshire